VeloNews is an American cycling magazine headquartered in Boulder, CO. It is published by Outside Inc. and is devoted to the sport of cycling.

History
The magazine was first published as Northeast Cycling News in March 1972 by Barbara and Robert George.

See also
 Cyclingnews.com
 Cycle Sport (magazine)
 Cycling Weekly
 International Cycle Sport
 Winning Bicycle Racing Illustrated

References

External links

1972 establishments in Colorado
Monthly magazines published in the United States
Sports magazines published in the United States
Cycling magazines
Cycling websites
English-language magazines
Magazines established in 1972
Magazines published in Colorado
Mass media in Boulder, Colorado